Mills Township may refer to:

 Mills Township, Bond County, Illinois
 Mills Township, Midland County, Michigan
 Mills Township, Ogemaw County, Michigan

Township name disambiguation pages